The men's 1500 metre freestyle event at the 2012 Summer Olympics took place on 3–4 August at the London Aquatics Centre in London, United Kingdom.

Shaking off a potential false start due to fan noise, China's Sun Yang put together a marvelous swim with a relentless attack on his world record to strike a long-distance freestyle double at the Olympic Games for the first time, since the Soviet Union's Vladimir Salnikov did so in 1980. Leading from the start, Sun quickly dropped two seconds under a world-record pace, as he pulled away further from the rest of the field to smash his own standard with a stunning gold-medal time in 14:31.02. Trailing behind the leader by 8.61 seconds on a dominant fashion, Canada's Ryan Cochrane held off a close battle from Tunisia's defending champion Oussama Mellouli for the silver in an American record of 14:39.63. Meanwhile, Mellouli faded down the stretch to pick up a bronze in 14:40.31, edging out of South Korea's Park Tae-hwan (14:50.61) by a wide margin of 10.3 seconds.

Italian teenager Gregorio Paltrinieri finished fifth in 14:51.92, while U.S. swimmer Connor Jaeger posted a sixth-place time of 14:52.99. Poland's Mateusz Sawrymowicz (14:54.32) and Great Britain's Daniel Fogg (15:00.76) rounded out a historic finale.

Notable swimmers missed the final including Jaeger's teammate Andrew Gemmell, Ukraine's Sergiy Frolov, Hungary's Gergő Kis, and British home favorite David Davies, bronze medalist in Athens eight years earlier.

Records
At the start of this event, the existing World and Olympic records were as follows.

The following records were established during the competition:

Results

Heats

Final

References

External links
NBC Olympics Coverage

Men's 01500 metre freestyle
Men's events at the 2012 Summer Olympics